Faty Papy (18 September 1990 – 25 April 2019) was a Burundian professional association football player who last played for Malanti Chiefs in the Premier League of Eswatini. He also played with the Burundi national football team.

Career 
Papy signed on 25 December 2008 for Trabzonspor, coming from AS Inter Star a football club based in Bujumbura.

Sports magazine Goal.com suggested Papy as one of the 10 African Players to Watch in 2009.

On 24 June 2009 Papy was loaned out to MVV. On 5 January 2011, Trabzonspor released the Burundian midfielder by mutual consent making him a free agent.

In 2016, Papy left South African club Bidvest Wits after four years, due to heart problems. In 2018, Papy returned to football, signing for National First Division club Real Kings. In January 2019, Papy was released by Real Kings due to a re-occurrence of a heart condition. Papy later signed for Premier League of Eswatini club Malanti Chiefs, making his debut for the club on 3 February 2019 in a 2–0 Ingwenyama Cup loss against Mbabane Highlanders.

International career 
Papy represented the Burundi national football team; he made his debut as a substitute in a 0–0 draw with the Seychelles national football team on 1 June 2008.

International goals

Death
Papy, who was previously reported to have had a heart condition, collapsed and died on 25 April 2019 while playing a match in Eswatini for Malanti Chiefs.

References

External links 
 Faty Papy's profile on his club Trabzonsport
 Interview Faty Papy at MVV (French, Dutch subtitles)

1990 births
2019 deaths
Burundian footballers
Burundian expatriate footballers
Burundi international footballers
Association football midfielders
Eerste Divisie players
Trabzonspor footballers
MVV Maastricht players
Sportspeople from Bujumbura
Burundian expatriate sportspeople in the Netherlands
Burundian expatriate sportspeople in Rwanda
Burundian expatriate sportspeople in South Africa
Burundian expatriate sportspeople in Turkey
Expatriate footballers in Turkey
Expatriate footballers in the Netherlands
Expatriate footballers in Rwanda
Expatriate soccer players in South Africa
Expatriate footballers in Eswatini
Bidvest Wits F.C. players
APR F.C. players
Real Kings F.C. players
Association football players who died while playing
Sport deaths in Eswatini